iCube-1 is a miniaturised satellite built by the Institute of Space Technology in Pakistan, with an objective to provide a wide range of future experiments in the domain of imaging, microgravity, biology, nanotechnology, space dynamics, chemistry, space physics and various other fields. It can also provide a testbed for developing satellite constellations for specific applications.

Launched in Low Earth Orbit, onboard Dnepr launch vehicle from Dombarovsky, Russia. It houses several sensors to collect data for scientific purposes. iCUBE-1 is a fully autonomous satellite and is capable of maintaining its health via its on-board computer. Five sides of the satellites carry two triple-junction (ATJ) solar cells, providing the spacecraft with 2 watts of power.

iCube-1 carries a camera with a resolution of 640 by 480 pixels. Communications with the ground are achieved through a 435.060 MHz uplink audio frequency-shift keying to provide a datarate of 1,200 bits per second. The 145.947 MHz downlink, which uses binary phase-shift keying, also provides a datarate of 1,200 bits per second. The satellite also carries CW and AX25 beacons. The programme cost around 3-3.5 million rupees.

Spokesperson IST Raza Butt said that it is a positive move for technology in Pakistan.
"The world is moving towards miniaturization. The launch cost is significantly low for CubeSats as compared to the bigger satellites. The low cost factor is very attractive for researchers who can test their payloads using these cubesats and then incorporate this technology in their bigger satellites", he commented.

Initially, iCUBE-1 will transmit a Continuous Wave Morse coded beacon with message “iCUBE-1 First CubeSat of Pakistan”. Amateur radio operators have a great opportunity to hear those signals on the VHF band. The satellite will send its health data to ground stations and can also be commanded from Satellite tracking and Control Station at IST.

See also

 Institute of Space Technology (IST)

References

Spacecraft launched in 2013
CubeSats
Mini satellites of Pakistan